This is a list of cities, towns and fortresses founded or renamed and repopulated by Philip II of Macedon.

Philippi
Heraclea Lyncestis
Heraclea Sintica
Philippopolis (Thessaly)
Philippopolis (Thracia)

Populated
Lists of populated places